The Wizard's Citadel is a 1984 video game published by Triffid Software Research.

Gameplay
The Wizard's Citadel is an adventure game in the Runemagic series, with approximately 120 locations.

Reception
Mike White reviewed The Wizard's Citadel for White Dwarf #63, giving it an overall rating of 8 out of 10, and stated that "A few tips: read messages as they are punctuated; stay cool when amazed; beware resurrection; go through unseen exits; trust in the Lord; and remember valour."

References

External links
The Wizard's Citadel at Spectrum Computing
Review of the Runemagic series in Micro Adventurer

1984 video games